Kilhadevacharya or Kilhadevji was the second Mahant of Gaddi of Galtaji, Jaipur, one of thirty-six dwaras of Ramanandi Sampradaya (Bairagis). He succeeded gaddi after his guru Krishna Das Payohari.
He was the Guru of Raja Askaran, ruler of Amber(Jaipur) and Narwar. And Diksha Guru of Rupsi Bairagi, son of Prithvi Singh, ruler of Amber(Jaipur) and uncle of Askaran. 

He had good knowledge of Samkhya Darshan and Yoga.

References

16th-century Indian people
16th-century Hindu religious leaders
16th-century Hindu philosophers and theologians
Indian Hindu spiritual teachers
Indian Vaishnavites
Vaishnava saints
Bhakti movement